Kachina Peaks Wilderness is a  wilderness area about  north of Flagstaff within the Coconino National Forest in the U.S. state of Arizona.

The area is named for the Hopi gods, or Kachinas, who according to Hopi mythology live here for part of every year. In mid-summer these gods fly from the top of the peaks to the Hopi mesas as clouds bringing the rains of the seasonal monsoons. These peaks are sacred to tribes including the Havasupai, Hopi, Navajo, and Zuni. Several religious shrines have been identified in the wilderness, some of which are still in use.

Geology
Kachina Peaks Wilderness is part of a large composite volcano that last erupted roughly two million years ago.  Some of the area's trails lead to the top of the Kachina Peaks: Humphreys Peak, Doyle Peak (11,460 ft), Fremont Peak (11,969 ft), and Agassiz Peak (12,365 ft).  These mountains form the rim of the volcano's inner basin, a huge caldera which was formed during its last eruption.

Kachina Peaks Wilderness features Arizona's best examples of Ice Age glaciation, found in lateral and medial moraines and abandoned stream beds.

Vegetation
The only Arctic-Alpine vegetation in Arizona is found in a fragile  zone on the peaks of Kachina Peaks Wilderness.  This is the only place where the threatened San Francisco Peaks groundsel (Packera franciscana) is found.

Recreation
Common recreational activities in Kachina Peaks Wilderness include hiking, backpacking, cross-country skiing, snowboarding, snowshoeing, and hunting.

See also
List of Arizona Wilderness Areas
List of U.S. Wilderness Areas
Wilderness Act

References

External links
Kachina Peaks Wilderness – Coconino National Forest
Kachina Peaks Wilderness – Wilderness.net
Kachina Peaks Wilderness – GORP

Protected areas of Coconino County, Arizona
Religious places of the indigenous peoples of North America
Wilderness areas of Arizona
Coconino National Forest